Beverly Beach State Park is a state park in the U.S. state of Oregon located  north of Newport. It is a full R.V. hookup camping area with showers, bathrooms, beach access, and a meeting hall where evening interpretive programs take place. The park also has tent areas, as well as yurts for rent. The yurts have a heater, beds, table, a couch, and a porch.

References

External links
  from Oregon Parks and Recreation Department

State parks of Oregon
Parks in Lincoln County, Oregon